Fredrick Richard Senanayake (known to as F. R. Senanayake)  (October 20, 1882 – January 1, 1926) was a Ceylonesen lawyer and independence activist. A leading member of the Sri Lankan independence movement, he was an elected member of the Colombo Municipal Council. He was the principal supporter of the early political career of his younger brother D. S. Senanayake, who would go on to lead Sri Lanka's independence movement, becoming the first Prime Minister of independent Sri Lanka in 1947.

Early life and education

He was born in the village of Botale in the Hapitigam Korale on October 20, 1882, to Don Spater Senanayake (1847–1907) and Dona Catherina Elizabeth Perera Gunasekera Senanayake (1852–1949). Spater Senanayake had made his fortune in graphite mining and at the time he was expanding into plantations and investments in the arrack renting franchise, later he would be awarded the title of Mudaliyar for his philanthropy. F. R. Senanayake had an elder brother, Don Charles "D. C." Senanayake; a younger brother Don Stephen Senanayake and one sister, Maria Frances Senanayake who married F. H. Dias Bandaranaike.

Educated at S. Thomas' College, Mutwal, Royal College, Colombo  and Downing College, Cambridge, where he gained a BA and an LL.B. degree. Thereafter he became a barrister from the Lincoln's Inn, London in 1905.

Law and business
On his return to Ceylon, he took oath as an Advocate in the Supreme Court of Ceylon and started a legal practice in the criminal courts. Soon becoming disenchanted with the legal profession, he focused on his family plantation and mining business. These were expanded to the holding of his wife's family after his marriage.

Community leader

Colombo Municipal Council
An active social worker, F. R. Senanayake was elected to the Colombo Municipal Council from the Colpetty Ward in 1912. He retained his seat in the municipality until his death.

Temperance movement
The three Senanayake brothers were involved in the temperance movement formed in 1912, led by F. R. Senanayake. He was a founder of the Buddhist Theosophical Society with Colonel Henry Steel Olcott and became its president in 1914. The Temperance movement actively campaigned against the Excise Ordinance and the government practice of Arrack renting, auctioning liquor licenses to open taverns and sell liquor locally. The practice brought in revenue to government coffers and was a profitable business for tavern owners leading to many business families establishing themselves. However, it caused many social problems in local communities with whispered liquor addiction.

Arrest and imprisonment
When World War I broke out in 1914, the Senanayake brothers joined the Colombo Town Guard. The brothers were imprisoned without charges during the 1915 riots and faced the prospect of execution since the British Governor Sir Robert Chalmers considered the temperance movement as seditious and had its leaders imprisoned. He was released after 46 days he was released on a bail bond.

Politics
Although capable of gaining membership to the Legislative Council of Ceylon, he didn't seek a seat in the Legislative Council. He stood for and was elected to the Colombo Municipal Council in 1912 and held the seat till his death. He formed the Lanka Mahajana Sabha and assisted in the formation of the Young Men's Buddhist Association. He was a strong supporter of his brother D. S. Senanayake being elected unopposed to the Legislative Council from Negombo in 1924.

Death
He died on January 1, 1926, in Calcutta, Sri Lanka following an appendicitis operation. He was on a pilgrimage to Gaya when he became ill.

Legacy
A statue of F. R. Senanayake has been erected in the Viharamahadevi Park facing the Colombo Town Hall. In the 2018 film Nidahase Piya DS about the life of his brother D S Senanayake, Palitha Silva played the role of FR Senanayake.

Personal life

Family
He married Ellen Attygalle, the youngest daughter of Mudaliyar Don Charles Gemoris Attygalle and they had six children; Richard Gotabhaya, Fredrick Tissa, Phyllis Nedra "Girlie", Swarna Neela, Chandra Upali, Rupawathi. His eldest son Richard Gotabhaya Senanayake went on to become a member of parliament and a Cabinet minister. His eldest daughter Phyllis Nedra "Girlie", married Siripala Samarakkody and Swarna Neela married his brother's younger son Robert Parakrama Senanayake. His brother-in-laws included Colonel T. G. Jayewardene and John Kotelawala Sr. He supported his sister-in-law, Alice Kotelawala after she became destitute following the death of her husband John Kotelawala Sr. He educated and cared for his nephews John Kotelawala and Justin Kotelawala.

Residence
Grassmere was the town house of F. R. Senanayake and R. G. Senanayake. The house was built by F. R. Senanayake in the exclusive neighbourhood of Gregory's Road and moved in with his family from his family a rented home in Colombo. It was at Grassmere, that Senanayake was taken into custody under martial law by Punjabi soldiers during the 1915 riots. Following Senanayake's sudden death in 1926, the house was inherited by his son R. G. Senanayake. Gregory's Road was renamed R. G. Senanayake Mawatha in 2013. Today the house hosts the Colombo branch of the Goethe-Institut.

See also 
 List of political families in Sri Lanka
 Senanayake family
 History of Sri Lanka
 Don Stephen Senanayake
 Richard Gotabhaya Senanayake
 Dudley Senanayake
 Rukman Senanayake

References

External links 
 Hundred days of terror under British
   The Senanayake Ancestry

1882 births
1926 deaths
Alumni of Downing College, Cambridge
Alumni of Royal College, Colombo
Alumni of S. Thomas' College, Mount Lavinia
Colombo municipal councillors
Members of Lincoln's Inn
National Heroes of Sri Lanka
People from British Ceylon
Prisoners and detainees of British Ceylon
Fredrick Richard
Sinhalese lawyers
Sri Lankan barristers
Sri Lankan independence movement
Sri Lankan mining businesspeople
Sri Lankan prisoners and detainees